Lagocheirus giesberti is a species of longhorn beetles of the subfamily Lamiinae. It was described by Hovore in 1998, and is known from Costa Rica.

References

Beetles described in 1998
Endemic fauna of Costa Rica
Lagocheirus